Elina Mikhina (born 16 July 1994, in Ridder) is a Kazakhstani athlete sprinter specialising in the 400 metres. She won the silver medal at the 2016 Asian Indoor Championships. Since January 2018 she is an athlete of the first in Kazakhstan professional track and field club Altay Athletics.

Her personal bests in the event are 52.09 seconds outdoors (Almaty 2016) and 52.53 seconds indoors (Ust-Kamenogorsk 2018).

Competition record

References

1994 births
Living people
People from Ridder, Kazakhstan
Kazakhstani female sprinters
Olympic female sprinters
Olympic athletes of Kazakhstan
Athletes (track and field) at the 2016 Summer Olympics
Asian Games silver medalists for Kazakhstan
Asian Games bronze medalists for Kazakhstan
Asian Games medalists in athletics (track and field)
Athletes (track and field) at the 2014 Asian Games
Athletes (track and field) at the 2018 Asian Games
Medalists at the 2018 Asian Games
Competitors at the 2017 Summer Universiade
Competitors at the 2019 Summer Universiade
Athletes (track and field) at the 2010 Summer Youth Olympics
World Athletics Championships athletes for Kazakhstan
Asian Indoor Athletics Championships winners
20th-century Kazakhstani women
21st-century Kazakhstani women